Niculae Cristian Stoian (born December 19, 1999) is a Moldovan-born Italian rugby union player. His usual position is as a Lock and he currently plays for Fiamme Oro.

Biography
Born in Moldavia, Stoian moved to Italy at a young age. He began playing rugby aged 15, signing up with the Rugby Anzio Club. He played an Under-16 and an Under-18 season in Anzio, before being loaned to the Roma Legio XV Rugby youth franchise for the 2016–17 season.

From 2017 to 2019, while playing for the Rugby Anzio Club, Stoian was selected in the F.I.R. Academy, playing two seasons in Serie A. In 2019 he was called up in the Italy Under 20 squad that took part in the Six Nations and World Cup category, making 10 appearances.

In the summer of 2019 Stoian was signed by Top10 team Fiamme Oro and for the end of 2019–20 Pro14 season and for 2020–21 Pro14 season he was named as Permit Player for Zebre. In November 2020 he was called up to the sItaly squad by coach Franco Smith, making his international debut on November 28, 2020, in the Autumn Nations Cup match with France, taking over from the bench.

On the 8 December 2021, Stoian was selected by Alessandro Troncon to be part of an Emerging Italy 27-man squad for the 2021 end-of-year rugby union internationals. 
On 26 May hw was called in Italy A squad for the South African tour in the 2022 mid-year rugby union tests against Namibia and Currie Cup XV team.

In 2021−22 season he played for Zebre in United Rugby Championship with a Dual contract in order to play on loan as Permit Player with Fiamme Oro in Top10.

References 

It's Rugby France Profile
Ultimate Rugby Profile

Moldovan rugby union players
1999 births
Living people
Italian rugby union players
Italy international rugby union players
Rugby union locks
Fiamme Oro Rugby players
Zebre Parma players
Sportspeople from Lazio
Moldovan emigrants to Italy
Sportspeople from Chișinău